Benjamin Franklin Cupid (born 18 March 1988) is a Caymanian footballer who plays as a defender for Elite and the Cayman Islands national team. He has represented the Cayman Islands during World Cup qualifying matches in 2011.

Career statistics

References

1988 births
Living people
Association football defenders
Caymanian footballers
People from Grand Cayman
Elite SC players
Cayman Islands Premier League players
Cayman Islands international footballers
Cayman Islands under-20 international footballers